Heinz Friedrich Hartig (September 10, 1907 in Kassel – September 16, 1969 in Berlin) was a German composer and harpsichordist.

In 1948 he began teaching at the Berliner Hochschule für Musik. Seven years  later, he took up a professorship there. He became acquainted with Boris Blacher, a composer with whom he collaborated extensively.

As harpsichordist, Hartig made numerous recordings, mostly in the role of continuo player rather than soloist. His compositional output consists mainly of concertos, sonatas, songs, oratorios and choral works. He also gained a distinguished reputation as a pedagogue. His students included Carlo Domeniconi and Roland Pfrengle.

Selected works
Sonata for clarinet and piano, op. 7
Concerto for violin and orchestra, op. 10
Der Trinker und die Spiegel for baritone and choir, op. 16
Concerto for piano and orchestra, op. 30
Songs for baritone and orchestra, op. 40
Variationen über einen siebentönigen Klang für Orchester op. 39
Wohin (oratorio)

References

1907 births
1969 deaths
20th-century classical composers
German classical composers
German male classical composers
20th-century German composers
20th-century German male musicians